KEZY (1240 AM) is a radio station broadcasting a Spanish language Christian format. Licensed to San Bernardino, California, United States, the station is currently owned by Hi-Favor Broadcasting, LLC.

KEZY and its sister stations KLTX and KSDO serve Southern California with Spanish Christian programming, and are branded Radio Inspiración.

History
The station initially signed on in 1948 as KRNO. On October 26, 1970, the station changed its call sign to KBON. On August 1, 1980, the station changed its call sign to KDIG; on July 27, 1987, to KLFE; on August 1, 1995, to KKLA; on August 30, 1999, to KLTH; and on September 27, 2000, to the current KEZY.

KEZY joined the Spanish language evangelical Christian network Radio Nueva Vida in 2002. Before that, it was a simulcast of KLTX 1390 AM, airing Christian teaching shows (such as Through the Bible) and Michael Reagan's talk show.  It was also the play-by-play home of the Rancho Cucamonga Quakes of the California League of minor-league baseball in 2000 and carried some high school football games as well.

By 2019, the station had disaffiliated from Radio Nueva Vida, but continued to air a Spanish language Christian format as Radio Inspiración.

References

External links
FCC History Cards for KEZY

EZY
Mass media in San Bernardino, California
EZY